Maya Bash (born in 1979) is an Israeli fashion designer.

She immigrated to Israel from Russia, and established the Maya Bash brand in 2005.

Biography 
Bash was born in 1979. In 1991 her family emigrated to Israel.
She studied at Shenkar College of Engineering and Design, and after her graduation, she opened a shop in the Gan HaHashmal district in Tel Aviv.

The Maya Bash brand offers unisex urban clothing, inspired by the designer's childhood in the former Soviet Union as well as her urban lifestyle in Tel Aviv. All the brand's collections are produced locally.

Bash has worked with film director Max Lomberg, painter Anna Lukashevsky, and photographer David Meskhi.

In a collaboration with Israeli visual artist Zoya Cherkassky, she has also designed clothing using fabric with patterns showing people wearing her clothes.

Following the designer's presentation at Paris Fashion Week, her clothing is sold in a few shops in Japan, Italy, Russia, Denmark, the Netherlands and the United States.

References

External links 
 

1979 births
Living people
Israeli Jews
Israeli fashion designers
Israeli women fashion designers
Jewish fashion designers